Alfredo France (29 October 1895 – 17 March 1938) was a Chilean footballer. He played in four matches for the Chile national football team in 1916. He was also part of Chile's squad for the 1916 South American Championship.

References

External links
 
 

1895 births
1938 deaths
Chilean footballers
Chile international footballers
Place of birth missing
Association football forwards